La Hoya may refer to:

La Hoya, Salamanca, a small municipality of Salamanca province, Spain
La Hoya, Alava, an important Bronze-Iron Age town of Biasteri (Alava, Basque Country)
 La Hoya, Veracruz, former name of Acajete, Veracruz, Mexico
 La Hoya, or La Hoia, Chihuahua, Mexico

See also
La Jolla, San Diego, California